Dread Jesus, published in 1999, is a book written by William David Spencer about the Rastafari movement.

()
1999 non-fiction books
Rastafari